Wolfhagen is a town in the district of Kassel, in Hesse, Germany. It is located 12 km southeast of Bad Arolsen, and 23 km west of Kassel on the German Timber-Frame Road. In 1992, the town hosted the 32nd Hessentag state festival.

Mayor
The mayor Reinhard Schaake (independent) was elected in 1999. Schaake was reelected in 2005 and 2011.

From private to public electrical grid
The town did not renew its contract with the large electricity provider, E.ON. The town took back control of its electrical power grid and was successful in paying back the loans for the start-up costs.

Sons and daughters of the city 

 Conrad Abée (1806-1873), politician, from 1860 Hessian Minister of Justice
 Theodor Kleinschmidt (1834-1881), traveler, merchant and naturalist
 Holger Trimhold (born 1953), footballer and coach
 Erhard Hofeditz (born 1953), football player

References

External links
 Official Webpage

Kassel (district)